HMS Cadmus (J230) was a turbine engine-powered  during the Second World War. Launched in 1942 the ship survived the war and was sold to Belgium in 1950 as Georges Lecointe (M901).

Design and description

The ships' complement consisted of 85 officers and ratings.

The reciprocating ships had two vertical triple-expansion steam engines, each driving one shaft, using steam provided by two Admiralty three-drum boilers.

The Algerine class was armed with a QF  Mk V anti-aircraft gun and four twin-gun mounts for Oerlikon 20 mm cannon. The latter guns were in short supply when the first ships were being completed and they often got a proportion of single mounts. By 1944, single-barrel Bofors 40 mm mounts began replacing the twin 20 mm mounts on a one for one basis. All of the ships were fitted for four throwers and two rails for depth charges.

Construction and career

Service in the Royal Navy 
The ship was ordered on 15 November 1940 at the Harland & Wolff at Belfast, Ireland. She was laid down on 21 July 1941 and launched on 27 May 1942. She was commissioned on 9 September 1942.

Service in the Belgian Navy 
Cadmus was renamed Georges Lecointe and was commissioned on 31 January 1950.

In 1959, she was decommissioned by the Navy and on 24 April 1960, she was sold to J. Desmedt Burcht Belgium. Her scrapping process started on 19 May.

References

Bibliography
 
 
 Peter Elliott (1977) Allied Escort Ships of World War II. MacDonald & Janes,

External links
 

 

Algerine-class minesweepers of the Royal Navy
Ships built in Belfast
1942 ships
World War II minesweepers of the United Kingdom
Algerine-class minesweepers of the Belgian Navy